Kheyrabad-e Olya (also Romanized as Kheyrābād-e ‘Olyā; also known as Kheyrābād and Kheytābād-e ‘Olyā) is a village in Takab Rural District, in the Central District of Dargaz County, Razavi Khorasan Province, Iran. At the 2006 census, its population was 54, in 13 families.

References 

Populated places in Dargaz County